Verkhnelandekhovsky District is an administrative and municipal district (raion), one of the twenty-one in Ivanovo Oblast, Russia. It is located in the east of the oblast. Its administrative center is the urban locality (a settlement) of Verkhny Landekh. Population:   5,631 (2002 Census);  The population of Verkhny Landekh accounts for 39.4% of the district's total population.

References

Notes

Sources

Districts of Ivanovo Oblast